James Street was a railway station on the Liverpool Overhead Railway, located just south of its namesake, within the city centre, close to the still-open Merseyrail James Street station.

It was opened on 6 March 1893 by the Marquess of Salisbury. The station was primarily used by workers travelling to the shipping offices and the Corn Exchange. Passengers could also use it to change for the Merseyrail station of the same name.

The station closed, along with the rest of the line, on 30 December 1956. No evidence of this station remains.

References

External links
 James Street station on Subterranea Britannica

Disused railway stations in Liverpool
Former Liverpool Overhead Railway stations
Railway stations in Great Britain opened in 1893
Railway stations in Great Britain closed in 1956